Kayla McCall Tausche (born July 17, 1986) is an American broadcast journalist. She has reported for CNBC since 2011. She is one of the station's political reporters and is based in Washington, D.C.

Personal life
Tausche was born in Minneapolis, Minnesota. She graduated from Greater Atlanta Christian School in 2004. She then attended University of North Carolina at Chapel Hill, earning a bachelor's degree in 2008 in business journalism and international politics. She received honors for in-depth research for analyzing the way international newspapers covered the handover of Hong Kong from British to Chinese rule.

While at UNC, Tausche was a member of the cheerleading team.  According to her Twitter profile, she is now an avid marathon runner. Tausche sits on the alumni board of the University of North Carolina at Chapel Hill School of Journalism and Mass Communication.

Tausche's rise at CNBC has been compared to Erin Burnett, an anchor at CNN who once served as a popular host of two CNBC shows.

She married Jeffrey Jacob Izant on April 11, 2015 at the Cathedral of Christ the King in Atlanta. Tausche is a Roman Catholic

Career
During college, Tausche worked in the Brussels bureau of the Associated Press.

After graduation, Tausche covered consumer and retail news at Bloomberg L.P., then joined the DealReporter unit of Mergermarket. While at DealReporter, Tausche was a frequent guest on CNBC and CNBC World to discuss mergers and acquisitions.

Tausche joined CNBC in January 2011 as a general assignment reporter covering corporate finance and deals for CNBC's business day programming. She is also a contributor to MSNBC, Today, Weekend Today, and NBC Nightly News with Brian Williams. Tausche has received acclaim for her coverage of various high-profile stories. The Financial Times featured a picture of Tausche with media mogul Rupert Murdoch on its front page while she covered the News Corporation phone hacking scandal.

Her analysis and reports on the Facebook IPO filing received wide coverage by numerous outlets.

Tausche served as a substitute anchor for  Squawk Box, Squawk on the Street and Power Lunch. and from May 2, 2014 until April 2017 she was a co-anchor of Squawk Alley.

She has also appeared on Washington Week in Review.

References

External links
Kayla Tausche via CNBC

Living people
People from Atlanta
Catholics from Georgia (U.S. state)
American Roman Catholics
American women television journalists
1986 births
CNBC people
UNC Hussman School of Journalism and Media alumni
Bloomberg L.P. people
21st-century American women